MRT 1 (МРТ 1) is a television station in North Macedonia owned and operated by Macedonian Radio-Television.

Current line-up

News shows 
Dnevnik MRT - main news at 10:00, 17:00, 19:30, and 23:00
MRT Vesti - news, runs at 13:00, and 15:00

MRT Production 
 Macedonia through antiquity 
 Macedonia through history
 Macedonia under Ottoman rule 
 20 years old Macedonian independence
 A century exile
 Makedonski narodni prikazni (Македонски народни приказни)
 Skopje continues
 Witnesses  
 IMRO
 Ohrid Archbishopric

Entertainment 
 Trotoar (Тротоар)
 The Ren & Stimpy Show (Рен и Стимби шоу)
 Stisni play (Стисни плеj)
 Iselenički džuboks (Иселенички Џубокс)
 SpongeBob SquarePants (Сунѓерот Боб Панталоновски)
 sonic the hedgehog (Eжот соник) (season 1 and 2)
 Prespav (Преспав)
 The Amazing World of Gumball (Беспомошниот живот на Гамбол)
 Animaniacs (Анималија)
 Adventures of Sonic the Hedgehog (Авантурите на Eжот соник)
 Big City Greens (Семејни фарми грин)
 The Penguins of Madagascar (Пингвините од Мадагаскар)

European soap operas
Hispania, la leyenda (Легендата на Хиспанија)

Foreign Series
 The Big Bang Theory - in Macedonian "Бубалици"
 Fringe - in Macedonian "На работ"
 Gossip Girl - in Macedonian "Озборувачка"
 CSI Las Vegas - in Macedonian "Истрага на местото на злосторството"
 CSI: Miami - in Macedonian "Истрага на местото на злосторството: Маjами"
 CSI: New York - in Macedonian "Истрага на местото на злосторството: Њуjорк"

Political/talk shows 
 Ako e...so Čom (Ако е...со Чом)
 Od naš agol (Од наш агол)
 Broker (Брокер) Evromagazin (Евромагазин)
 Da bideme načisto (Да бидеме начисто)
 Agrar (Аграр)

 Documentary 
 Talkači (Талкачи)
 Apokalipsa (Апокалипса)

 Educational 
 Dzvon (Ѕвон)
 Word on the street - we learn English Third era Time for a baby World of silence From school to a carrier ТV-Class (ТВ-Училница)Reality
 Toa Sum Jas''

Sports
 FIFA World Cup
 UEFA European Championship
 UEFA Champions League

MRT 1 HD 
MRT 1 HD is a HD simulcast of MRT 1, launched in 2012.

References

External links
www.mrt.mk

Television channels in North Macedonia
Television channels and stations established in 1964
Macedonian Radio Television